The women's 1500 metres event at the 1992 World Junior Championships in Athletics was held in Seoul, Korea, at Olympic Stadium on 18 and 20 September.

Medalists

Results

Final
20 September

Heats
18 September

Heat 1

Heat 2

Participation
According to an unofficial count, 18 athletes from 12 countries participated in the event.

References

1500 metres
1500 metres at the World Athletics U20 Championships